Heathwood is an outer south-western suburb in the City of Brisbane, Queensland, Australia.

Geography 
It is relatively small in area but marked by brand new big houses.

The Logan Motorway passes through the suburb from west (Forest Lake) to east (Larapinta). It divides the suburb into two distinct areas, the northern part which is residential and the southern part which is industrial in the south and south-western parts and undeveloped in the south-eastern part.

Heathwood is bounded to the north-east by Portree Crescent, Blunder Road, and Wadeville Street,  to the south-west by Oxley Creek, to the south by Johnson Road, and to the west by Old Blunder Road.

All the streets in Heathwood are named after native Australian flora/plants and trees.

History 
The suburb was declared a suburb in 1970 when it was separated from Acacia Ridge. Heathwood was named after an early settler in the district.

The median age of the Heathwood population was 32 years of age, 5 years below the Australian median. 54.2% of people living in Heathwood were born in Australia, compared to the national average of 69.8%; the next most common countries of birth were New Zealand 7.6%, Vietnam 5.5%, England 4.7%, India 3.2%, South Africa 2.5%. 63.3% of people spoke only English at home; the next most common languages were 9.1% Vietnamese, 3.6% Hindi, 2.5% Mandarin, 1.1% Sinhalese, 1.1% Samoan.

Education 
There are no schools in Heathwood. The nearest primary school is Pallara State School in Pallara but on the boundary with Heathwood. The nearest secondary school is Forest Lake State High School in Forest Lake.

Transport
Heathwood is connected to Brisbane CBD by a number of routes e.g. Centenary Highway through Forest Lake, Ipswich Motorway through Oxley, Logan Motorway and by rail through Richlands.

Brisbane Transport operates two routes that serve stops in Heathwood:

118: to Brisbane City via Forest Lake and Logan Motorway
460: to Brisbane City via Forest Lake Shops, Richlands Station and Indooroopilly

References

Notes

External links

 

Suburbs of the City of Brisbane
Populated places established in 1975
1975 establishments in Australia